Oenothera pilosella is a species of flowering plant in the evening primrose family known by the common name meadow evening primrose. It is native to the United States and eastern Canada.

This species is grown as an ornamental garden plant. It produces flowers with yellow petals in late spring and early summer.

There are two subspecies. One, subsp. sessilis, is a rare herb native to the Mississippi River Valley in Louisiana and Arkansas.

References

pilosella
Flora of North America
Taxa named by Constantine Samuel Rafinesque